VBB or variant may refer to:
 Verkehrsverbund Berlin-Brandenburg, a transport association run by public transport providers in the German states of Berlin and Brandenburg
 Sweco aka Swedish Consultants (formerly: AB Vattenbyggnadsbyrån aka "VBB"), engineering consultancy company
 Southeast Babar language (ISO 639 code: vbb)
 ALK Airlines (ICAO airline code: VBB)
 VBB, a positive IC power-supply pin in FET ICs